Zhi Gang Sha (born 1956) is a spiritual leader.

Life and ideas
Sha is a strong promoter of forms of spirituality. He has published 20 books, including ten New York Times bestselling books, including Soul Healing Miracles: Ancient and New Sacred Wisdom, Knowledge, and Practical Techniques for Healing the Spiritual, Mental, Emotional, and Physical Bodies, which has sold more than 300,000 copies since its release in November 2013. His 2014 book, Soul Mind Body Science System, debuted on the Amazon Top 100 Bestseller List.

Sha is a registered acupuncturist in Canada. He is also a Tai Chi practitioner. He was the lead acupuncturist for the World Health Organization, has been named Qigong Master of the Year and in 2006 was awarded the Martin Luther King Jr. Commemorative Commission Award for his humanitarian efforts. He teaches his patients that chanting mantras in Mandarin Chinese can heal their ailments. and practices what he refers to as "soul healings".

Publications
Sha has written twenty-four books, including Zhi Neng Medicine: Revolutionary Self-Healing Methods from China (Zhi Neng Press, 1996), Power Healing: The Four Keys to Energizing Your Body, Mind and Spirit (Harper San Francisco, 2002), Soul Mind Body Medicine: A Complete Soul Healing System for Optimum Health and Vitality (New World Library, 2006), Living Divine Relationships (Heaven's Library Publication Corp., 2006), Soul Wisdom I: Practical Soul Treasures to Transform Your Life (Heaven's Library Publication Corp., 2007), and Soul Communication: Opening Your Spiritual Channels for Success and Fulfillment (Heaven's Library Publication Corp., 2007). 
 
In 2008, Sha partnered with Atria Books, a major division of Simon and Schuster, to create the "Soul Power" series: The Power of Soul (2009), Divine Soul Songs: Sacred Practical Treasures to Heal, Rejuvenate, and Transform You, Humanity, Mother Earth, and All Universes (2009) and Divine Soul Mind Body Healing and Transmission System: The Divine Way to Heal You, Humanity, Mother Earth, and All Universes (2009), Tao I: The Way of All Life (2010), Divine Transformation: The Divine Way to Self-clear Karma and Transform Your Health, Relationships, Finances, and More (2010), Tao II: The Way of Healing, Rejuvenation, Longevity, and Immortality (2010), Tao Song and Tao Dance: Sacred Sound, Movement, and Power from the Source for Healing, Rejuvenation, Longevity, and Transformation of All Life (2011), and Divine Healing Hands: Experience Divine Power to Heal You, Animals, and Nature, and to Transform All Life (2012). Soul Healing Miracles: Ancient and New Sacred Wisdom, Knowledge, and Practical Techniques for Healing the Spiritual, Mental, Emotional, and Physical Bodies (BenBella Books, 2013).

Awards
 County of Maui Proclamation 2014
 Martin Luther King Jr. Commemorative Award 2006
 City of Honolulu Certificate 2014
 City of Honolulu Proclamation 2015
 Governor of Hawaii Commendation 2014
 Hawaii Senate Commendation 2016
 Los Angeles County Commendation 2016
 City of San Marino Commendation 2017
 US Congress Outstanding Chinese Award 2017
 Hawaii Commendation May 2017
 International Tara Award Dec 2017
 US Representative Congratulations Mar 2019
 Hawaii Governor's Message Mar 2019
 US Congress Congratulations 2019
 Certificate of Special Congressional Recognition Mar 2019

References

External links
 

Faith healers
Living people
New Thought writers
1956 births